William Joseph Barre (1830, Newry – 1867) was a prolific Irish architect who built many well known buildings in Belfast in a Gothic Revival style, but was always overshadowed by his great rival, Charles Lanyon. 

He moved to Belfast from his home town of Newry in 1860. He designed several of Ulster's most significant buildings during the Victorian period. They are distinctive and often dramatic. Many are churches but he also designed secular buildings.
 
Barre had a colourful history when it came to architectural competitions.  By the time he was thirty he had beaten numerous rivals to win the task of designing the Ulster Hall.  His design for the Methodist Church on University Road (originally the Wesleyan Church, on what was then Botanic Road) took first place in a competition of 1864, the work being completed the following year.

But he was not so lucky in the competition in 1856, to design the monument for the 3rd Marquess of Londonderry, which resulted in the building of the Scrabo Tower. Although his design took first place, the decision was overturned on grounds of cost, the commission instead going to Charles Lanyon, whose design had come fourth. Lanyon, notes Barre's biographer, was county surveyor at the time.

History came close to repeating itself in 1865: the selection committee charged with choosing a design for the monument to Prince Albert picked Barre's clock; the General Committee, of which Lanyon was a member, chose to overrule in favour of Lanyon's design.  This time, however, public outcry was sufficient to restore the original decision, leaving us with Belfast's best known, if somewhat skewed (it is out by over a metre at the top), Albert clock tower.

Barre built several other monuments, perhaps the most unusual being that to the Banbridge-born arctic explorer Francis Crozier, featuring polar bears poised on top of flying buttresses.

Barre died of tuberculosis at the age of 37, having completed several dozen major buildings, including private houses, schools, factories, and, above all, churches.

Works
Barre's best known work is the Albert Memorial Clock, in the centre of Belfast, built 1865–1870. He also designed:
 Ulster Hall, Bedford Street, Belfast, 1859–62. Italianate music hall.
 University Road Methodist Church, Belfast, 1864
 Bryson House, Bedford Street, Belfast, 1865–67. Former High Victorian linen warehouse in medieval Italian palazzo style.
 Shaftesbury Square Hospital, Belfast, 1868
 the Provincial Bank of Ireland in Castle Place, Belfast
 Clanwilliam House, now called Danesfort, in Belfast, 1864
 ceiling renovation of St George's Church, Belfast, 1865
 The Moat, Belfast
 remodel of Roxborough Castle in County Tyrone
 Newry Non-subscribing Presbyterian church
 Riverside Presbyterian Church, Newry
 St Anne’s Church of Ireland Church (Drumglass), Dungannon

References

 Victorian Web
 Description of Clanwilliam House

1830 births
1867 deaths
People from Newry
19th-century Irish architects